Agonidium oldeanicum is a species of ground beetle in the subfamily Platyninae. It was described by Basilewsky in 1962.

References

oldeanicum
Beetles described in 1962